The Federal Ministry of Justice, abbreviated BMJ, is a cabinet-level ministry of the Federal Republic of Germany. Under the German federal system, individual States are most responsible for the administration of justice and the application of penalties. The Federal Ministry of Justice devotes itself to creating and changing law in the classic core areas related to Constitutional law. The Ministry also analyzes the legality and constitutionality of laws prepared by other ministries. The German Federal Court of Justice, the German Patent and Trade Mark Office (GPTO), and the German Patent Court all fall under its scope. The ministry is officially located in Berlin.

The BMJ was founded on January 1, 1877, as the Imperial Justice Office (Reichsjustizamt). After Germany became a republic in 1919, it was renamed Reichsministerium der Justiz (Imperial ministry of Justice). The ministry was refounded as the Bundesministerium der Justiz in 1949. In several laws predating 1949, the ministry and the minister are however referred to as Reichsministerium der Justiz and Reichsminister der Justiz, respectively. This has gradually been replaced with the new name and title when laws have been amended, most recently in 2010.

List of ministers

State Secretaries for Justice, 1876–1918
  
Heinrich Friedberg 1876–1879
Hermann von Schelling 1879–1889
Otto von Oehlschläger 1889–1891
Robert Bosse 1891–1892
Eduard von Hanauer 1892–1893
Rudolf Arnold Nieberding 1893–1909
Hermann Lisco 1909–1917
Paul Georg Christof von Krause 1917–1919

Ministers of Justice, 1918–1945

Federal Ministers, since 1949
Political Party:

References

External links
Official homepage in German (translation available)
Organization chart of the ministry
Tasks and organisation of the ministry
Official translation of German federal laws/parts (in German)
Baden-Württemberg (in German)
Bayern  (in German)
Berlin (in German)
Online-Portal (in German)
Richtlinie 2001/95/EG (in German)
Verbraucherzentralen in Deutschland (in German)

Justice, Federal Ministry of
Justice
Ministries established in 1877
Germany
Consumer ministries
1877 establishments in Germany